

The Isaacs Spitfire is a single seat homebuilt sporting aircraft design created by John O. Isaacs, a former Supermarine employee and retired schoolmaster and designer of the Isaacs Fury, as a 6/10th scale replica of a Supermarine Spitfire. Its first flight was on 5 May 1975.

As per the original Spitfire, the Isaacs Spitfire was a cantilever low-wing monoplane of semi-elliptical planform. The twin spar wing was built in one piece, mainly of spruce with birch plywood skin. The fuselage was of identical construction. The landing gear was non-retractable and included a tailwheel.

Plans are available for sale to home constructors.

Specifications

See also

References

 
 

1970s British sport aircraft
Homebuilt aircraft
Supermarine Spitfire replicas
Single-engined tractor aircraft
Low-wing aircraft
Aircraft first flown in 1975